Conscientious Objector Adolf (Swedish: Samvetsömma Adolf) is a 1936 Swedish comedy film directed by Sigurd Wallén and starring Adolf Jahr, Karin Albihn and Weyler Hildebrand. It was shot at the Råsunda Studios in Stockholm. The film's sets were designed by the art director Arne Åkermark.

Synopsis
An opera performer gains a leading role, but his joy is cut short when he is called up for military service.

Cast
 Adolf Jahr as 	Adolf Berg
 Karin Albihn as 	Ulla Waern
 Weyler Hildebrand as 	Göransson
 Elsa Carlsson as 	Aunt Maria
 Torsten Winge as 	Lt. Pettersson
 Nils Ericsson as 	Knutte
 Stig Järrel as 	Anton
 Hugo Björne as 	Maj. Waern
 Bertil Anderberg as 	Läkarbiträde 
 Wiktor Andersson as 	Den Tandlöse 
 Astrid Bodin as 	Woman at Party 
 Rolf Botvid as Man in Evening Dress 
 Gudrun Brost as 	Woman at Party 
 Eric Dahlström as 	Doctor 
 Nils Ekstam as 	Director 
 John Elfström as 	Läkarbiträde 
 Georg Fernqvist as 	Captain 
 Sigge Fürst as 	Man in Evening Dress 
 Hilding Gavle as Colonel 
 Karin Granberg as 	Woman at Party 
 Richard Lund as 	Major 
 Ethel Ohlin as 	Ballet Dancer 
 Knut Pehrson as Judge 
 Christian Schrøder as 	Lieutenant 
 Alice Skoglund as 	Colonel's Friend 
 Carl Ström as Captain 
 Åke Uppström as 	Guard 
 John Westin as 	Captain

References

Bibliography 
 Krawc, Alfred. International Directory of Cinematographers, Set- and Costume Designers in Film: Denmark, Finland, Norway, Sweden (from the beginnings to 1984). Saur, 1986.

External links 
 

1936 films
1936 comedy films
Swedish comedy films
1930s Swedish-language films
Swedish black-and-white films
Films directed by Sigurd Wallén
1930s Swedish films